One is the international debut album by Danish singer Ida Corr and a compilation of songs from her previously released studio albums Streetdiva and Robosoul. Corr wrote or co-wrote almost all songs on the album, she also co-produced some of the songs.

The album has been released in Scandinavia on March 17, 2008 as a two-disc version, which includes the album itself and a CD with remixes of her biggest hit "Let Me Think About It". On August 26, 2008 it was released in the United States (the main album only, with a slightly altered track list). On January 13, 2009 a release in Russia through the label Soyuz followed. The album was released in Germany on October 30, 2009 through Ministry of Sound, little over a month after the release of the single "I Want You". Ida Corr plans to release One in more countries, before she releases a new album in late 2009.

Singles
The following songs from the album originated as radio singles in Denmark between 2004 and 2007 and originated from the albums Streetdiva (2005) and Robosoul (2006): "U Make Me Wanna", "Make Them Beg", "Country Girl", "Late Night Bimbo" and "Lonely Girl". The Fedde Le Grand remix of "Let Me Think About It" was released 6 months before One came out. The second single "Ride My Tempo" has been released in February 2008 in Denmark and Sweden.

Track listings

Scandinavian edition

Notes:
"Let Me Think About It" (Fedde le Grand Club Mix)": remixed by Fedde Le Grand for flamingorecords.com
"Let Me Think About It" (Funkerman Remix): remixed by Funkerman for flamingorecords.com
"Let Me Think About It" (Eddie Thoneick Remix): remix and additional production by Eddie Thoneick at Tonic-studios, Huelheim, Germany. Guitars by Eddie Thoneick
"Let Me Think About It" (Patchworkz Astro Remix): produced in Copenhagen by Brian Oldenborg
"Let Me Think About It" (Micky Slim Remix): remix and additional production by Micky Slim on behalf of 24 management
"Let Me Think About It" (Jason Herd's Jfunk Remix): remix and additional production by Jason Herd courtesy of Jfunk Recordings. Mixed and engineered by Jason Herd. Instrumentation by Andy Hicky
"Let Me Think About It" (Gregor Salto & DJ Madskillz Remix): remix for g-rex.com
"Let Me Think About It" (James Talk Remix): remix and additional production by James Talk
"Let Me Think About It" (MBK Extended Mix): remix by MBK for Lifted House
"Let Me Think About It" (Sidelmann Remix): remix by Jesper Sidelmann for Lifted House

US edition

Russian edition

German edition

Release history

References

External links
 One at Discogs

Ida Corr albums
2008 compilation albums
2008 remix albums
European Border Breakers Award-winning albums